The 2017 European Mixed Team Badminton Championships was held in Lubin, Poland, between 15–19 February 2017 and  organised by Badminton Europe and Polish Badminton Federation. Denmark, the defending champion, retained their title after defeating Russia by 3-0 in the final.

Qualification
Seven highest ranked countries, including Poland as host, qualified directly to the championship. The remaining countries were divided to five groups where the winner of each group will occupy the remaining five spots.

Direct qualifiers

 (host country)

Qualification stage
The qualification stage was held between 11–13 November 2016 in 5 cities across Europe. France, Bulgaria, Ireland, Switzerland, and Sweden qualified to the main events.

Group stage

Group 1

Group 2

Group 3

Group 4

Knockout stage

Quarterfinals

Semifinals

Final

References

2017
European Mixed Team Badminton Championships
2017 European Mixed Team Badminton Championships
European Mixed Team Badminton Championships
International sports competitions hosted by Poland